Eréndira Ibarra is a Mexican actress and casting director, known for Sense8 (2015–18), Las Aparicio (2015), The Matrix Resurrections (2021) and Ingobernable (2017).

Personal life 
Ibarra is the daughter of producer Epigmenio Ibarra, and studied at the artistic studio in Casa Azul. She is bisexual, and has been married to Venezuelan model Fredd Londoño since 2010. They have one son, Rocco (born 2017).

Filmography

Film

Television roles

References

External links 

 

21st-century Mexican actresses
1985 births
Mexican film actresses
Living people
Actresses from Mexico City
Bisexual actresses
Mexican LGBT actors